Loudon may refer to:

Places
In the United States:
Loudon, Massachusetts, formerly a constituent part of Otis, Massachusetts
Loudon, New Hampshire
Loudon (CDP), New Hampshire
Loudon, Tennessee
Loudon County, Tennessee
Loudoun County, Virginia, USA
Loudon Township, Fayette County, Illinois
Loudon Township, Carroll County, Ohio
Loudon Township, Seneca County, Ohio

Other uses
Loudon (name)
The New Hampshire Motor Speedway, in Loudon, New Hampshire
Loudon Classic, a motorcycle race held there
Loudon's Highlanders, 18th century infantry regiment of the British Army
Loudon Park Cemetery in Baltimore, Maryland
Loudon Park National Cemetery in Baltimore, Maryland
Governor General Loudon (ship), mail steamer, named after James Loudon, present at the Krakatoa eruption

See also
Loudoun, an area in Scotland
Earl of Loudoun
John Claudius Loudon Scottish gardener, designer, author and planner
L'Oudon, a commune in Calvados department, France
Loudun, a commune in Vienne department, France 
London (disambiguation)
Louden (disambiguation)